Symphorien Champier (1471–1539) was a Lyonnese doctor and writer. Born in Saint-Symphorien, France, Champier was a relation of the Chevalier de Bayard through his wife, Marguerite Terrail.

Life
A doctor of medicine at Montpellier, Champier was the personal physician of Antoine, Duke of Lorraine, whom he followed to Italy with Louis XII, attending to several battles, and finally settling in Lyon. He worked in Lyon alongside François Rabelais (who wrote satirically of him in Gargantua and Pantagruel), where he established the College of the Doctors of Lyon. There he fulfilled the duties of an alderman and contributed to numerous local foundations, in particular L'Ecole des médecins de Lyon ("The School of the Doctors of Lyon").

His fame was considerable in Lyon, which in the 16th century was the greatest manufacturer of medical books in France, with editors such as Sébastien Gryphe. In addition to medicinal science, Champier studied Greek scholars and Arab medicine and composed a great number of historical works, including Chroniques de Savoie in 1516 and Vie de Bayard in 1525. During his last years in Lyon, he printed several medicine books against Arab medicine, a falsification of Greek science according to his judgment.

He is most famous today for his pro-woman tract La nef des dames vertueuses [The Ship of Virtuous Ladies], one of the first 'feminist' tracts written in French. This book, first published in 1503, is composed of four books. Book 4 essentially imports neoplatonism [from Marsilio Ficino] to France for pro-woman ends. 

He was an extreme opponent to Renaissance occultism, and wrote in 1532 a 'Epistola campegiana de tranmutatione metallorum contra alchimistas'.

Champier added a codicil to his last wills in May 1539, and he is not noticed in any document after this date, so historians believe that he died in the second part of 1539.

See also

 Pierre Terrail, seigneur de Bayard
 François Rabelais

References
 Champier, Symphorien. Dictionnaire Bouillet.
 Copenhaver, Brian. Symphorien Champier and the Reception of the Occultist Tradition in Renaissance France. The Hague: Mouton, 1979.
 Reeser, Todd, The Ship of Virtuous Ladies (Toronto, 2018). Translation of three books of the text.

External links

16th-century French physicians
16th-century French historians
1471 births
1539 deaths